"Tissues" is a song by English musician Yungblud which was released on 30 August 2022 as the fifth single from his third studio album Yungblud (2022). The song was released by labels Locomotion Recordings and Geffen Records. "Tissues" was written by Yungblud, Chris Greatti, Jake Torrey and Jordan Gable, and produced by Greatti, while Robert Smith is given an honourary songwriting credit. Lyrically, the song is about the ups and downs of love.

In November 2022, Yungblud released a new version of the song featuring French singer Louane.

Background
The song was originally released on 11 March 2022 as a promotional single before it was officially released as a single. Discussing the genesis of the song, which samples "Close to Me" by The Cure, in an interview with Zane Lowe, Yungblud explained:

Live performances
Yungblud debuted the song as part of his set at the 2022 Glastonbury Festival alongside other new tracks "I Cry 2" and "The Funeral". The song was performed as part of his halftime show at the NFL London Games on 3 October 2022 held at Tottenham Hotspur Stadium. Yungblud included it as part of his Live Lounge set on 27 October 2022. He also performed the song on Jimmy Kimmel Live! on 12 September 2022 and on The X Factor Italy on 18 November 2022.

Music video
The song's video was released on 2 September 2022. It was filmed in London, directed by Charlie Sarsfield and features Yungblud dancing through various scenes while other people are frozen in time. As the song reaches the final chorus, the frozen people join him in a joyous, energetic choreographed dance routine. In a statement on the video, Yungblud explained “This is a new era for Yungblud. I wanted to dance, I wanted to move, and I wanted to really personify in the video what this song means. It’s happiness and it’s euphoria and it’s letting the fuck go.”

Credits and personnel
 Jordan Gable – songwriter
 Chris Greatti – producer, songwriter, bass, drums, electric guitar, programming
 Dominic Harrison – vocals, songwriter, electric guitar, acoustic guitar
 Mitch McCarthy – engineering, mixing
 Paul Meaney – synthesizer, drum programming 
 Randy Merrill – mastering
 Anne Peichert – vocals (remix)
 Matt Schwartz – synthesizer
 Robert Smith – songwriter
 Jake Torrey – songwriter, drums, bass, electric guitar

Charts

References

2022 singles
2022 songs
Yungblud songs
Geffen Records singles
Songs written by Yungblud